Arandisa is a monotypic genus of Namibian huntsman spiders containing the single species, Arandisa deserticola. It was first described by R. F. Lawrence in 1938, and is found in Namibia.

See also
 List of Sparassidae species

References

Monotypic Araneomorphae genera
Sparassidae